Morwa Assembly constituency is an assembly constituency in Samastipur district in the Indian state of Bihar.

Overview
As per Delimitation of Parliamentary and Assembly constituencies Order, 2008, No. 135 Morwa Assembly constituency is composed of the following: Morwa community development block; Muradpur Bangra, Gauspur
Sarsauna, Kothiya, Manpura, Harishankarpur Baghauni, Madhopur, Dhgharua, Kaswe Aahar, Ramapur Maheshpur, Rahimabad, Rajwa and Fatehpur gram panchayats of Tajpur CD Block; Sirdilpur Supaul, Hasanpur Surat, Jorpura, Shahpur Undi, Chaksalem, Darba, Imansarai and Bahadurpur Patori of Patori CD Block.

Morwa Assembly constituency is part of No. 22 Ujiarpur (Lok Sabha constituency).

Election results

2010
In the 2010 state assembly elections, Baidhnath Sahani of JD(U) won the newly constituted Morwa seat defeating his nearest rival Ashok Singh of RJD.

2015
In the 2015 state assembly elections, VidyaSargar Singh Nishad of JD(U) won.

2020

References

External links
 

Assembly constituencies of Bihar
Politics of Samastipur district